is a Japanese fencer. She competed in the women's individual foil event at the 2000 Summer Olympics.

References

External links
 

1972 births
Living people
Japanese female foil fencers
Olympic fencers of Japan
Fencers at the 2000 Summer Olympics
People from Wakayama Prefecture
Asian Games medalists in fencing
Fencers at the 1998 Asian Games
Asian Games bronze medalists for Japan
Medalists at the 1998 Asian Games
21st-century Japanese women